Strati can refer to
 Strati (automobile), the world's first 3D printed electric car manufactured by Local Motors
 Stratus cloud

People with surname Strati
 Antonio Strati (born 1949), Italian organizational theorist and artist
 Ermir Strati (born 1983), Albanian football player
 Laura Strati (born 1990), Italian female long jumper
 Saimir Strati (born 1966), Albanian mosaic artist